Mauricio R. Delgado is a Brazilian-born American neuroscientist who is professor and chair of the Psychology Department at Rutgers University Newark. He is known for his research on the neuroscience of decision-making.

References

External links
Faculty page
Delgado Lab

Living people
American neuroscientists
Brazilian emigrants to the United States
People from São Paulo
Rutgers University faculty
Wesleyan University alumni
University of Pittsburgh alumni
Year of birth missing (living people)